Ebusus ebusus is a species of skipper butterfly in the family Hesperiidae. It is the only species in the monotypic genus Ebusus.

References
Natural History Museum Lepidoptera genus database

Hesperiinae
Hesperiidae genera